Jared Jarvis (born 29 August 1994) is an Antigua and Barbuda sprinter. He competed in the 4 × 100 metres relay event at the 2015 World Championships in Athletics in Beijing, China.

References

External links

1994 births
Living people
Antigua and Barbuda male sprinters
World Athletics Championships athletes for Antigua and Barbuda
Place of birth missing (living people)
Olympic athletes of Antigua and Barbuda
Athletes (track and field) at the 2016 Summer Olympics
Athletes (track and field) at the 2015 Pan American Games
Athletes (track and field) at the 2018 Commonwealth Games
Pan American Games competitors for Antigua and Barbuda
Commonwealth Games competitors for Antigua and Barbuda